The General Prologue is the first part of The Canterbury Tales by Geoffrey Chaucer. It introduces the frame story, in which a group of pilgrims travelling to the shrine of Thomas Becket in Canterbury agree to take part in a storytelling competition, and describes the pilgrims themselves.

Synopsis
The frame story of the poem, as set out in the 858 lines of Middle English which make up the General Prologue, is of a religious pilgrimage. The narrator, Geoffrey Chaucer, is in The Tabard Inn in Southwark, where he meets a group of 'sundry folk' who are all on the way to Canterbury, the site of the shrine of Saint Thomas Becket, a martyr reputed to have the power of healing the sinful.

The setting is April, and the prologue starts by singing the praises of that month whose rains and warm western wind restore life and fertility to the earth and its inhabitants. This abundance of life, the narrator says, prompts people to go on pilgrimages; in England, the goal of such pilgrimages is the shrine of Thomas Becket. The narrator falls in with a group of pilgrims, and the largest part of the prologue is taken up by a description of them; Chaucer seeks to describe their 'condition', their 'array', and their social 'degree'. The narrator expresses admiration and praise towards the pilgrims' abilities.

The pilgrims include a knight; his son, a squire; the knight's yeoman; a prioress, accompanied by a nun and the nun's priest; a monk; a friar; a merchant; a clerk; a sergeant of law; a franklin; a haberdasher; a carpenter; a weaver; a dyer; a tapestry weaver; a cook; a shipman; a doctor of physic; a wife of Bath; a parson and his brother, a plowman; a miller; a manciple; a reeve; a summoner; a pardoner; the Host (a man called Harry Bailey); and Chaucer himself. At the end of this section, the Host proposes that the group ride together and entertain one another with stories. He lays out his plan: each pilgrim will tell two stories on the way to Canterbury and two on the way back. Whoever has told the most meaningful and comforting stories, with "the best sentence and moost solaas" (line 798) will receive a free meal paid for by the rest of the pilgrims upon their return. The company agrees and makes the Host its governor, judge, and record keeper. They set off the next morning and draw lots to determine who will tell the first tale. The Knight wins and prepares to tell his tale.

Structure
The General Prologue establishes the frame for the Tales as a whole (or of the intended whole) and introduces the characters/storytellers. These are introduced in the order of their rank in accordance with the three medieval social estates (clergy, nobility, and commoners and peasantry). These characters are also representative of their estates and models with which the others in the same estate can be compared and contrasted.

The structure of the General Prologue is also intimately linked with the narrative style of the tales. As the narrative voice has been under critical scrutiny for some time, so too has the identity of the narrator himself. Though fierce debate has taken place on both sides, (mostly contesting that the narrator either is, or is not, Geoffrey Chaucer), most contemporary scholars believe that the narrator is meant to be Chaucer himself to some degree. Some scholars, like William W. Lawrence, claim that the narrator is Geoffrey Chaucer in person. Others, like Marchette Chute for instance, contest that the narrator is instead a literary creation like the other pilgrims in the tales.

Chaucer makes use of his extensive literary and linguistic knowledge in the General Prologue by interplaying Latin, French, and English words against each other. French was considered a hierarchal, courtly, and aristocratic language during the Middle Ages, whereas Latin was the language of learning. The opening lines of The Canturbury Tales show a diversity of phrasing by including words of French origin like "droghte," "veyne," and "licour" alongside English terms for nature: "roote," "holt and heeth," and "croppes."

Sources

John Matthews Manly attempted to identify pilgrims with real fourteenth-century people. In some instances, such as the Summoner and the Friar, he attempts localization to a small geographic area. The Man of Law is identified as Thomas Pynchbek (also Pynchbeck), who was chief baron of the exchequer. Sir John Bussy, an associate of Pynchbek, is identified as the Franklin. The Pembroke estates near Baldeswelle supplied the portrait for the unnamed Reeve.

Sebastian Sobecki argues that the General Prologue is a pastiche of the historical Harry Bailey's surviving 1381 poll-tax account of Southwark's inhabitants.

Translation

The following are the first 18 lines of the General Prologue. The text was written in a dialect associated with London and spellings associated with the then-emergent Chancery Standard.

In modern prose:

When April with its sweet showers has pierced March's drought to the root, bathing every vein in such liquid by whose virtue the flower is engendered, and when Zephyrus with his sweet breath has also enlivened the tender plants in every wood and field, and the young sun is halfway through Aries, and small birds that sleep all night with an open eye make melodies (their hearts so goaded by Nature), then people long to go on pilgrimages, and palmers seek faraway shores and distant saints known in sundry lands, and especially they wend their way to Canterbury from every shire of England to seek the holy blessed martyr, who helped them when they were ill.

Gallery of the pilgrims

References

External links

"General Prologue", middle-english hypertext with glossary and side-by-side middle english and modern english

Modern Translation of the General Prologue and Other Resources at eChaucer 
"Prologue to The Canterbury Tales" – a plain-English retelling for non-scholars.

General Prologue
Canterbury Tales
Canterbury Tales, The